Karsdale  is a community in the Canadian province of Nova Scotia, located in Annapolis County. It is situated on the west bank of the Annapolis Basin. The community is named after Sir William Williams, 1st Baronet, of Kars.

References

Communities in Annapolis County, Nova Scotia